Mistaken for Strangers is a 2013 documentary film featuring the American indie rock band The National. The film is directed by Tom Berninger, brother of lead singer Matt Berninger, and premiered April 17, 2013 at the Tribeca Film Festival in New York City.

Synopsis 
When the National goes on tour in 2010, singer Matt Berninger invites his younger brother Tom to tour with them as part of the crew. Tom aspires to be a filmmaker and documents the National being on tour, as well as the process of himself making a film about his successful older brother.

Critical reception 
On review aggregator Rotten Tomatoes, the film holds an approval rating of 92% based on 61 reviews, with an average rating of 7.53/10. The website's critics consensus reads: "A suitably complicated look at fraternal bonds, Mistaken for Strangers offers more depth and insight than the usual tour documentary." On Metacritic, the film has a weighted average score of 72 out of 100, based on 19 critics, indicating "generally favorable reviews".

Jillian Mapes in her review for Pitchfork Media wrote "what may be the funniest, most meta music movie since Spinal Tap". Ann Hornaday in her review for The Washington Post described it as "a funny, eccentric and finally deeply poignant depiction of art, family, self-sabotage and the prickly intricacies of brotherly love."

References

External links 
 
 
 

2013 films
2013 documentary films
2010s English-language films
2010s American films
American documentary films
Rockumentaries
The National (band)
English-language documentary films